The 2010 Euro Cup of Australian rules football was held in Milan (Italy) on October 2, 2010, with 15 national teams. For the first time a women's international match took place during the competition.

Venue
Matches were played at one of the best stadiums in the area, the Marazzini Venegoni Sports Centre in Parabiago.

Teams

Pools round

Group A

Group B

Group C

Group D

Semi finals

Ranking Matches

Grand final

Women's Match

Final standings
1. Croatia (EU Cup Winners)
2. The Netherlands (Silver)
3. Ireland (Bronze)
4. England
5. Spain (Plate Winners) 
6. Italy
7. Germany
8. Wales
9. Scotland (Bowl Winners) 
10. France 
11. Switzerland
12. Austria 
13. Czech Republic 
14. Catalonia 
15. EU Crusaders

EU Cup Best & Fairest: Josh Carmichael (Netherlands), Mario Vázquez (Spain) & Sebastian Caffaratti (Italy) - 16 votes

Leading Goalkicker: Josh Carmichael (Netherlands), Jono Newman (Switzerland) & Sebastian Caffaratti (Italy) - 5 goals

References

External links
 Official site of the 2010 EU Cup

EU Cup
International sports competitions hosted by Italy
EU Cup
2010 in European sport
2010 in Australian rules football
2010s in Milan